Bismarck is an unincorporated community in Cuming County, Nebraska, United States.

History
A post office was established at Bismarck in 1868, and remained in operation until it was discontinued in 1902. The community was named for Otto von Bismarck, a Prussian statesman and politician.

References

Populated places in Cuming County, Nebraska
Unincorporated communities in Nebraska